Warrington Cycle Campaign is a cycling campaign group that aims to promote safer cycling and more cycling. Although based in Warrington in England, the campaign has received international recognition, mainly due to its "Cycle Facility of the Month" feature.

The Warrington Cycle campaign has produced publications aimed at improving the safety of cyclists on the road. These include a leaflet encouraging better understanding between bus drivers and cyclists and a report on the design and use of cycle lanes.

Cycle Facility of the Month

The Cycle Facility of the Month is a humorous feature that highlights poor, unusable and absurd cycle facilitates. This feature has received international recognition in the media and from national governments.
The first facility the site featured in March 2001 was in Warrington, but the feature quickly went national, with the April 2001 facility showing a cycle lane in Camden, then in October 2007 it went international and featured a cycle lane in France.

Crap Cycle Lanes

Based upon Warrington's Cycle Facility of the Month, Eye Books produced a book called Crap Cycle Lanes showing 50 of the worst facilities.

Proceeds from the book go the Cyclists' Defence Fund, a UK charity that provides legal representation for cyclists.

See also
 Segregated cycle facilities
 List of cycleways
 Utility cycling

References

External links and bibliography
 
 Cycle Facility of the Month

Crap Cycle Lanes. Publisher Eye Books 10 November 2007. 

Warrington
Cycling organisations in the United Kingdom